The 1982 Chatham Cup was the 55th annual nationwide knockout football competition in New Zealand.

Early stages of the competition were run in three regions (northern, central, and southern), with the National League teams receiving a bye until the Fourth Round of the competition. In all, 125 teams took part in the competition. Note: Different sources give different numberings for the rounds of the competition: some start round one with the beginning of the regional qualifications; others start numbering from the first national knock-out stage. The former numbering scheme is used in this article.

The 1982 final
Mount Wellington won the league/cup double for the second time, the first club to do so. Miramar Rangers' team included England's John Fashanu, who would later win an FA Cup winner's medal with Wimbledon FC. He is the first — and  the only — player to play in both a Chatham Cup final and an FA Cup final.

The final was deadlocked for the entirety of normal time, and for the first period of extra time. The only goal came two minutes into the second half of extra time with a shot from Keith Nelson for the Mount. Despite the low score, the final was an exciting one, with Miramar soaking up the Mount's attacks and then countering with dangerous breaks.

Results

Third Round

* Won on penalties by Caversham (5-4)

Fourth Round

† Gisborne City disqualified

Western AFC received a bye through to the fifth round.

Fifth Round

Quarter-finals

* Napier City Rovers won 5-4 on penalties.

Semi-finals

Final

References

Rec.Sport.Soccer Statistics Foundation New Zealand 1982 page
UltimateNZSoccer website 1982 Chatham Cup page

Chatham Cup
Chatham Cup
Chatham Cup
Chat